Najara can stand for:
 Najara, a character from television series Xena: Warrior Princess,
 Nájera, a town in Spain
 Rabbi Israel ben Moses Najara, a famous Jewish poet and biblical commentator